The State Register of Heritage Places is maintained by the Heritage Council of Western Australia. , 188 places are heritage-listed in the Shire of Narrogin, of which 23 are on the State Register of Heritage Places.

List
The Western Australian State Register of Heritage Places, lists the following 23 state registered places within the Shire of Narrogin:

References

Narrogin
Narrogin
Shire of Narrogin